Matthew Joseph Continetti (born June 24, 1981) is an American journalist and a senior fellow in Social, Cultural, and Constitutional Studies at the American Enterprise Institute.

Life and career
Continetti was born in Alexandria, Virginia. He is the son of Cathy (née Finn) and Joseph F. Continetti. Continetti graduated from Columbia University in 2003. While in college he wrote for the Columbia Spectator, the Intercollegiate Studies Institute's magazine, CAMPUS, and the Columbia Political Review. In summer 2002, he did a Collegiate Network internship at National Review, where he worked as a research assistant for Rich Lowry. He joined The Weekly Standard as an editorial assistant, and later became associate editor. He is now a contributing editor to National Review.

His articles and reviews have also appeared in The New York Times, The Wall Street Journal, National Review,  The Washington Post, The Los Angeles Times, and The Financial Times. He has also been an on-camera contributor to Bloggingheads.tv and has criticized Glenn Beck as "nonsense." He has argued the American media turned on Sarah Palin during the 2008 campaign because they had blind allegiance to Barack Obama. He has criticized American academia as uniformly left-wing.

From October 2015 to May 2016, the Washington Free Beacon, under Continetti's stewardship, hired Fusion GPS to conduct opposition research on "multiple candidates" during the 2016 presidential election, including Donald Trump. The Free Beacon stopped funding his research when Trump was selected as the Republican Party nominee.

Personal life
Continetti lives in Arlington, Virginia. He is married to Anne Elizabeth Kristol, the daughter of William Kristol, Vice President Dan Quayle's Chief of Staff. Continetti converted to Judaism in 2011, prior to his marriage to Kristol.

Bibliography
 The K Street Gang: The Rise and Fall of the Republican Machine, Doubleday (2006)
 The Persecution of Sarah Palin: How the Elite Media Tried to Bring Down a Rising Star, Sentinel (2009)
 The Right: The Hundred-Year War for American Conservatism, Basic Books (2022)

References

External links
 
 
 The Weekly Standard | Matthew Continetti (articles from The Weekly Standard, now kept by Washington Examiner) 
 Matthew Continetti | National Review (bio & articles from National Review)
  Matthew Continetti (@continetti) · Twitter

Columbia University alumni
Living people
American political writers
American male journalists
Jewish American writers
The Weekly Standard people
1981 births
21st-century American Jews